Charlotte Jones Anderson (born July 26, 1966) is the Dallas Cowboys' executive vice president and chief brand officer. Jones was appointed chairman of the Salvation Army's National Advisory Board in 2010 and is the first woman to ever serve in that role. In 2012, Jones was named chairperson of the NFL Foundation and is responsible for leading philanthropic efforts in player care, youth football, and medical research. Jones is the first woman to serve in this capacity for an NFL charitable institution, and the first woman to represent club ownership as leader of a major professional sports league foundation.

Biography
A native of Little Rock, Arkansas, Jones is a 1988 graduate of Stanford University where she earned a B.S. degree in human biology. Jones lives in Dallas, Texas, with her three children. She is the daughter of the owner/president/general manager of the Dallas Cowboys, Jerry Jones, and the sister of Dallas Cowboys executives Stephen Jones and Jerry Jones Jr.

In September 2013, Jones was named one of SportsBusiness Journal's 2013 Game Changers as a Team Leader.

Before coming to the Cowboys, Jones oversaw the office and legislative staff of U.S. Representative Tommy F. Robinson (R-Arkansas) as chief of staff from 1989 to 1990. She resigned shortly after Robinson began his 1990 bid for Arkansas governor and when her father endorsed Robinson's opponent, Sheffield Nelson.

She oversees all strategies and applications surrounding the team’s brand as it is presented to fans world-wide, and she is in charge of the marketing department of the Cowboys which includes the Dallas Cowboys Cheerleaders and the mascot Rowdy. Both entities report to Jones. Jones participated in the Forbes 9th Annual CMO Summit in Miami.

Jones engineered the Dallas Cowboys' collaboration with Victoria's Secret to launch the first Victoria's Secret PINK store inside a professional stadium or arena.

Jones was announced as the chairperson of the 2014 Final Four, which took place in April 2014. Jones was responsible for Cowboys Stadium playing host to Super Bowl XLV, the 2010 NBA All Star Game, and the annual AT&T Cotton Bowl Classic.

On June 26, 2016, Jones was named as the 89th most important person in the National Football League by USA Today newspaper.

References

1966 births
Living people
Dallas Cowboys executives
Stanford University alumni
Businesspeople from Little Rock, Arkansas
Jones family (American football)